The Yemen Oil and Gas Corporation (YOGC,المؤسسة اليمنية العامة للنفط والغاز ), a government-owned corporation under the direction of the Ministry of Oil and Minerals of Yemen, is an oil and natural gas exploration and production company headquartered in Sana'a. It was established in 1996.

YOGC has the following subsidiaries:
Petroleum Products Distribution Company
Yemen Gas Company (YGC)
Aden Refinery Company (ARC)
Petroleum Exploration and Production Authority (PEPA)
SAFER Exploration & Production Operations Company
Yemen Investments Company for Oil and Minerals (YICOM)
Yemen Refining Company (YRC)

See also

Yemen LNG

References

External links
YOGC Corporate Website

Oil and gas companies of Yemen
National oil and gas companies
Energy companies established in 1996